The United Kingdom is a unitary state with devolution that is governed within the framework of a parliamentary democracy under a constitutional monarchy in which the monarch, currently Charles III, King of the United Kingdom, is the head of state while the Prime Minister of the United Kingdom, Rishi Sunak, is the head of government. Executive power is exercised by the British government, on behalf of and by the consent of the monarch, and the devolved governments of Scotland, Wales and Northern Ireland. Legislative power is vested in the two chambers of the Parliament of the United Kingdom, the House of Commons and the House of Lords, as well as in the Scottish, Northern Irish and Welsh parliaments.

The British political system is a two party system. Since the 1920s, the two dominant parties have been the Conservative Party and the Labour Party. Before the Labour Party rose in British politics, the Liberal Party was the other major political party, along with the Conservatives. While coalition and minority governments have been an occasional feature of parliamentary politics, the first-past-the-post electoral system used for general elections tends to maintain the dominance of these two parties, though each has in the past century relied upon a third party, such as the Liberal Democrats, to deliver a working majority in Parliament. A Conservative–Liberal Democrat coalition government held office from 2010 until 2015, the first coalition since 1945. The coalition ended following parliamentary elections on 7 May 2015, in which the Conservative Party won an outright majority of seats, 330 of the 650 seats in the House of Commons, while their coalition partners lost all but eight seats.

With the partition of Ireland, Northern Ireland received home rule in 1920, though civil unrest meant direct rule was restored in 1972. Support for nationalist parties in Scotland and Wales led to proposals for devolution in the 1970s, though only in the 1990s did devolution happen. Today, Scotland, Wales and Northern Ireland each possess a legislature and executive, with devolution in Northern Ireland being conditional on participation in certain all-Ireland institutions. The British government remains responsible for non-devolved matters and, in the case of Northern Ireland, co-operates with the government of the Republic of Ireland. Devolution of executive and legislative powers may have contributed to increased support for independence in the constituent parts of the United Kingdom. The principal Scottish pro-independence party, the Scottish National Party, became a minority government in 2007 and then went on to win an overall majority of MSPs at the 2011 Scottish parliament elections and forms the current Scottish Government administration. In a 2014 referendum on independence 44.7% of voters voted for independence versus 55.3% against. In Northern Ireland, Irish nationalist parties such as Sinn Féin advocate Irish reunification. In Wales Plaid Cymru support Welsh independence.

The constitution of the United Kingdom is uncodified, being made up of constitutional conventions, statutes and other elements. This system of government, known as the Westminster system, has been adopted by other countries, especially those that were formerly parts of the British Empire. The United Kingdom is also responsible for several dependencies, which fall into two categories: the Crown Dependencies, in the immediate vicinity of the UK, are strictly-speaking subject to the Crown (ie, the Monarch) but not part of the sovereign territory of the United Kingdom (though de facto British territory), and British Overseas Territories, as British colonies were re-designated in 1983, which are part of the sovereign territory of the United Kingdom, in most of which aspects of internal governance have been delegated to local governments, with each territory having its own first minister, though the title used may differ, such as in the case of the Chief Minister of Gibraltar, though they remain subject to the Parliament of the United Kingdom (when United Kingdom is used to refer only to that part of the British Realm, or sovereign British territory, which is governed directly by the British Government, and not via local subsidiary governments, United Kingdom logically refers to a local government area, though the national government performs the role of local government within that area).

History

 Treaty of Union agreed by commissioners for each parliament on 22 July 1706.
 Acts of Union 1707, passed by both the Parliament of England and the Parliament of Scotland to form the Kingdom of Great Britain.
 Act of Union 1800, passed by both the Parliament of Great Britain and the Parliament of Ireland to form the United Kingdom of Great Britain and Ireland.
 Government of Ireland Act 1920, passed by the Parliament of the United Kingdom and created the partition of Ireland. The republican southern part of Ireland became Republic of Ireland (also known as Éire), leaving Northern Ireland part of the union.
 The Accession of the United Kingdom to the European Communities (EC) took effect on 1 January 1973.
 The United Kingdom withdrew from the European Union (EU) on 31 January 2020.

The Crown

The British monarch, currently Charles III, is the Head of state of the United Kingdom. Though he takes little direct part in government, the Crown remains the fount in which ultimate executive power over government lies. These powers are known as royal prerogative and can be used for a vast amount of things, such as the issue or withdrawal of passports, to the dismissal of the prime minister or even the declaration of war. The powers are delegated from the monarch personally, in the name of the Crown, and can be handed to various ministers, or other officers of the Crown, and can purposely bypass the consent of Parliament.

The head of His Majesty's Government, the prime minister, also has weekly meetings with the sovereign, where he may express his feelings, warn, or advise the prime minister in the government's work.

According to the uncodified constitution of the United Kingdom, the monarch has the following powers:

Domestic powers
 The power to dismiss and appoint a prime minister
 The power to dismiss and appoint other ministers
 The power to summon, prorogue and dissolve Parliament
 The power to grant or refuse Royal Assent to bills (making them valid and law)
 The power to commission officers in the Armed Forces
 The power to command the Armed Forces of the United Kingdom
 The power to appoint members to the King's Counsel
 The power to issue and withdraw passports
 The power to grant prerogative of mercy (though capital punishment is abolished, this power is still used to change sentences)
 The power to grant honours
 The power to create corporations via Royal charter

Foreign powers
 The power to ratify and make treaties
 The power to declare war and peace
 The power to deploy the Armed Forces overseas
 The power to recognise states
 The power to credit and receive diplomats

Executive
Executive power in the United Kingdom is exercised by the Sovereign, King Charles III, via His Majesty's Government and the devolved national authorities - the Scottish Government, the Welsh Government and the Northern Ireland Executive.

His Majesty's Government

The monarch appoints a Prime Minister as the head of His Majesty's Government in the United Kingdom, guided by the strict convention that the Prime Minister should be the member of the House of Commons most likely to be able to form a Government with the support of that House.  In practice, this means that the leader of the political party with an absolute majority of seats in the House of Commons is chosen to be the Prime Minister. If no party has an absolute majority, the leader of the largest party is given the first opportunity to form a coalition. The Prime Minister then selects the other Ministers which make up the Government and act as political heads of the various Government Departments. About twenty of the most senior government ministers make up the Cabinet and approximately 100 ministers in total comprise the government.  In accordance with constitutional convention, all ministers within the government are either Members of Parliament or peers in the House of Lords.

As in some other parliamentary systems of government (especially those based upon the Westminster system), the executive (called "the government") is drawn from and is answerable to Parliament - a successful vote of no confidence will force the government either to resign or to seek a parliamentary dissolution and a general election. In practice, members of parliament of all major parties are strictly controlled by whips who try to ensure they vote according to party policy. If the government has a large majority, then they are very unlikely to lose enough votes to be unable to pass legislation.

The Prime Minister and the Cabinet

The Prime Minister, currently Rishi Sunak, is the most senior minister in the Cabinet.  Their tenure begins when they are appointed by the monarch. The Prime Minister is responsible for chairing Cabinet meetings, selecting Cabinet ministers (and all other positions in His Majesty's government), and formulating government policy. The Prime Minister being the de facto leader of the UK, exercises executive functions that are nominally vested in the sovereign (by way of the Royal Prerogatives). Historically, the British monarch was the sole source of executive powers in the government. However, following the lead of the Hanoverian monarchs, an arrangement of a "Prime Minister" chairing and leading the Cabinet began to emerge. Over time, this arrangement became the effective executive branch of government, as it assumed the day-to-day functioning of the British government away from the sovereign.

Theoretically, the Prime Minister is primus inter pares (i.e., Latin for "first among equals") among their Cabinet colleagues. While the Prime Minister is the senior Cabinet Minister, they are theoretically bound to make executive decisions in a collective fashion with the other Cabinet ministers. The Cabinet, along with the PM, consists of Secretaries of State from the various government departments, the Lord High Chancellor of Great Britain, the Lord Privy Seal, the Lord President of the Council, the President of the Board of Trade, the Chancellor of the Duchy of Lancaster and Ministers without portfolio. Cabinet meetings are typically held weekly, while Parliament is in session.

Government departments and the Civil Service

The Government of the United Kingdom contains a number of ministries known mainly, though not exclusively as departments, e.g., Department for Education. These are politically led by a Government Minister who is often a Secretary of State and member of the Cabinet. The minister may also be supported by a number of junior ministers. In practice, several government departments and ministers have responsibilities that cover England alone, with devolved bodies having responsibility for Scotland, Wales and Northern Ireland, (for example - the Department of Health), or responsibilities that mainly focus on England (such as the Department for Education).

Implementation of the Minister's decisions is carried out by a permanent politically neutral organisation known as the Civil Service. Its constitutional role is to support the Government of the day regardless of which political party is in power. Unlike some other democracies, senior civil servants remain in post upon a change of Government. Administrative management of the Department is led by a head civil servant known in most Departments as a Permanent Secretary. The majority of the civil service staff in fact work in executive agencies, which are separate operational organisations reporting to Departments of State.

"Whitehall" is often used as a metonym for the central core of the Civil Service. This is because most Government Departments have headquarters in and around the former Royal Palace Whitehall.

Devolved national administrations

Scottish Government

The Scottish Government is responsible for all issues that are not explicitly reserved to the United Kingdom Parliament at Westminster, by the Scotland Act; including NHS Scotland, education, justice, rural affairs, and transport. It manages an annual budget of more than £25 billion. The government is led by the First Minister, assisted by various Ministers with individual portfolios and remits. The Scottish Parliament nominates a Member to be appointed as First Minister by the King. The First Minister then appoints their Ministers (now known as Cabinet Secretaries) and junior Ministers, subject to approval by the Parliament.  The First Minister, the Ministers (but not junior ministers), the Lord Advocate and Solicitor General are the Members of the 'Scottish Executive', as set out in the Scotland Act 1998. They are collectively known as "the Scottish Ministers".

Welsh Government

The Welsh Government and Senedd have more limited powers than those devolved to Scotland, although following the passing of the Government of Wales Act 2006 and the 2011 Welsh devolution referendum, the Senedd can now legislate in some areas through an Act of Senedd Cymru. The current First Minister of Wales is Mark Drakeford of Welsh Labour.

Northern Ireland Executive

The Northern Ireland Executive and Assembly have powers closer to those already devolved to Scotland. The Northern Ireland Executive is led by a diarchy, most recently First Minister Paul Givan (Democratic Unionist Party) and deputy First Minister Michelle O’Neill (Sinn Féin).

Legislatures

The British Parliament is the supreme legislative body in the United Kingdom (i.e., there is parliamentary sovereignty), and government is drawn from and answerable to it. Parliament is bicameral, consisting of the House of Commons and the House of Lords. There are also devolved Scottish and Welsh parliaments and a devolved assembly in Northern Ireland, with varying degrees of legislative authority.

British Parliament

House of Commons

The Countries of the United Kingdom are divided into parliamentary constituencies of broadly equal population by the four Boundary Commissions. Each constituency elects a Member of Parliament (MP) to the House of Commons at general elections and, if required, at by-elections. As of the 2010 general election there are 650 constituencies (there were 646 before that year's general election). At the 2017 general election, of the 650 MPs, all but one - Sylvia Hermon - were elected as representatives of a political party. However, as of the 2019 general election, there are currently 11 independent MPs, who have either chosen to leave their political party or have had the whip withdrawn.

In modern times, all prime ministers and leaders of the opposition have been drawn from the Commons, not the Lords. Alec Douglas-Home resigned from his peerages days after becoming prime minister in 1963, and the last prime minister before him from the Lords left in 1902 (the Marquess of Salisbury).

One party usually has a majority in parliament, because of the use of the First Past the Post electoral system, which has been conducive in creating the current two party system. The monarch normally asks a person commissioned to form a government simply whether it can survive in the House of Commons, something which majority governments are expected to be able to do. In exceptional circumstances the monarch asks someone to 'form a government' with a parliamentary minority which in the event of no party having a majority requires the formation of a coalition government or 'confidence and supply' arrangement. This option is only ever taken at a time of national emergency, such as war-time. It was given in 1916 to Bonar Law, and when he declined, to David Lloyd George and in 1940 to Winston Churchill. A government is not formed by a vote of the House of Commons, it is a commission from the monarch. The House of Commons gets its first chance to indicate confidence in the new government when it votes on the Speech from the Throne (the legislative programme proposed by the new government).

House of Lords

The House of Lords was previously a largely hereditary aristocratic chamber, although including life peers, and Lords Spiritual. It is currently midway through extensive reforms, the most recent of these being enacted in the House of Lords Act 1999. The house consists of two very different types of member, the Lords Temporal and Lords Spiritual. Lords Temporal include appointed members (life peers with no hereditary right for their descendants to sit in the house) and ninety-two remaining hereditary peers, elected from among, and by, the holders of titles which previously gave a seat in the House of Lords. The Lords Spiritual represent the established Church of England and number twenty-six: the Five Ancient Sees (Canterbury, York, London, Winchester and Durham), and the 21 next-most senior bishops. Secular organisations such as Humanists UK oppose bishops sitting in the House of Lords. The movement to end the Church of England's status as the official state religion of the United Kingdom is known as disestablishmentarianism. Alternatives include a secular state in which the state purports to be officially neutral in matters of religion.

The House of Lords currently acts to review legislation initiated by the House of Commons, with the power to propose amendments, and can exercise a suspensive veto. This allows it to delay legislation if it does not approve it for twelve months. However, the use of vetoes is limited by convention and by the operation of the Parliament Acts 1911 and 1949: the Lords may not veto the "money bills" or major manifesto promises (see Salisbury convention). Persistent use of the veto can also be overturned by the Commons, under a provision of the Parliament Act 1911. Often governments will accept changes in legislation in order to avoid both the time delay, and the negative publicity of being seen to clash with the Lords. However the Lords still retain a full veto in acts which would extend the life of parliament beyond the 5-year term limit introduced by the Parliament Act 1911.

The Constitutional Reform Act 2005 outlined plans for a Supreme Court of the United Kingdom to replace the role of the Law Lords.

The Supreme Court of the United Kingdom replaced the House of Lords as the final court of appeal on civil cases within the United Kingdom on 1 October 2009.

Devolved national legislatures

Though the British parliament remains the sovereign parliament, Scotland and Wales have devolved parliaments and Northern Ireland has an assembly. Each can have its powers broadened, narrowed or changed by an act of the UK Parliament. Both the Scottish Parliament and the Welsh Senedd gained legislative power over some forms of taxation between 2012 and 2016. Their power over economic issues is significantly constrained by an act of parliament passed in 2020.

The UK is a unitary state with a devolved system of government. This contrasts with a federal system, in which sub-parliaments or state parliaments and assemblies have a clearly defined constitutional right to exist and a right to exercise certain constitutionally guaranteed and defined functions and cannot be unilaterally abolished by acts of the central parliament.

All three devolved institutions are elected by proportional representation: the Additional Member System is used in Scotland and Wales, and Single Transferable Vote is used in Northern Ireland.

England, therefore, is the only country in the UK not to have its own devolved parliament. However, senior politicians of all main parties have voiced concerns in regard to the West Lothian Question, which is raised where certain policies for England are set by MPs from all four constituent nations whereas similar policies for Scotland or Wales might be decided in the devolved assemblies by legislators from those countries alone. Alternative proposals for English regional government have stalled, following a poorly received referendum on devolved government for the North East of England, which had hitherto been considered the region most in favour of the idea, with the exception of Cornwall, where there is widespread support for a Cornish Assembly, including all five Cornish MPs. England is therefore governed according to the balance of parties across the whole of the United Kingdom.

The government has no plans to establish an English parliament or assembly although several pressure groups are calling for one. One of their main arguments is that MPs (and thus voters) from different parts of the UK have inconsistent powers. Currently an MP from Scotland can vote on legislation which affects only England but MPs from England (or indeed Scotland) cannot vote on matters devolved to the Scottish parliament. Indeed, the former Prime Minister Gordon Brown, who was an MP for a Scottish constituency until the 2015 general election, introduced some laws that only affect England and not his own constituency. This anomaly is known as the West Lothian question.

The policy of the British Government in England was to establish elected regional assemblies with no legislative powers. The London Assembly was the first of these, established in 2000, following a referendum in 1998, but further plans were abandoned following rejection of a proposal for an elected assembly in North East England in a referendum in 2004. Unelected regional assemblies remain in place in eight regions of England.

Scottish Parliament

The Scottish Parliament is the national, unicameral legislature of Scotland, located in the Holyrood area of the capital Edinburgh. The Parliament, informally referred to as "Holyrood" (cf. "Westminster"), is a democratically elected body comprising 129 members who are known as Members of the Scottish Parliament, or MSPs. Members are elected for four-year terms under the mixed member proportional representation system. As a result, 73 MSPs represent individual geographical constituencies elected by the plurality ("first past the post") system, with a further 56 returned from eight additional member regions, each electing seven MSPs.

The current Scottish Parliament was established by the Scotland Act 1998 and its first meeting as a devolved legislature was on 12 May 1999. The parliament has the power to pass laws and has limited tax-varying capability. Another of its roles is to hold the Scottish Government to account. The "devolved matters" over which it has responsibility include education, health, agriculture, and justice. A degree of domestic authority, and all foreign policy, remains with the British Parliament in Westminster.

The public take part in Parliament in a way that is not the case at Westminster through Cross-Party Groups on policy topics which the interested public join and attend meetings of alongside Members of the Scottish Parliament (MSPs).

The resurgence in Celtic language and identity, as well as 'regional' politics and development, has contributed to forces pulling against the unity of the state. This was clearly demonstrated when - although some argue it was influenced by general public disillusionment with Labour - the Scottish National Party (SNP) became the largest party in the Scottish Parliament by one seat.

Alex Salmond (leader of SNP between 2004 and 2014) made history becoming the first First Minister of Scotland from a party other than Labour following the 2007 Scottish Parliament election. The SNP governed as a minority administration following this election. Nationalism (support for breaking up the UK) has experienced a dramatic rise in popularity in recent years, with a pivotal moment coming at the 2011 Scottish Parliament election where the SNP capitalised on the collapse of the Liberal Democrat support to improve on their 2007 performance to win the first ever outright majority at Holyrood (despite the voting system being specifically designed to prevent majorities), with Labour remaining the largest opposition party.

This election result prompted the leader of the three main opposition parties to resign. Iain Gray was succeeded as Scottish Labour leader by Johann Lamont, Scottish Conservative and Unionist leader, Annabel Goldie was replaced by Ruth Davidson, and Tavish Scott, leader of the Scottish Liberal Democrats was replaced by Willie Rennie.

A major SNP manifesto pledge was to hold a referendum on Scottish Independence, which was duly granted by the British Government and held on 18 September 2014. When the nationalists came to power in 2011, opinion polls placed support for independence at around 31%, but in 2014, 45% voted to leave the union. In the wake of the referendum defeat, membership of the SNP surged to over 100,000, overtaking the Liberal Democrats as the third largest political party in the UK by membership, and in the general election of May 2015 the SNP swept the board and took 56 of the 59 Westminster constituencies in Scotland (far surpassing their previous best of 11 seats in the late 1970s) and winning more than 50% of the Scottish vote.

Salmond resigned as First Minister of Scotland and leader of the SNP following the country's rejection of independence in September 2014, and was succeeded in both roles by the deputy First Minister and deputy leader of the SNP, Nicola Sturgeon. Also in the wake of the referendum, Lamont stood down as Scottish Labour leader and Jim Murphy was elected to replace her. Murphy was the leader until the general election in 2015 in which he lost his seat in Westminster. After the defeat, he resigned his position and her deputy MSP Kezia Dugdale became leader of the party and leader of SLP in Holyrood. In 2017 she unexpectedly resigned and was replaced as Scottish Labour leader by the English-born Richard Leonard. He held the post until quitting in January 2021, with Anas Sarwar replacing him the following month.

Senedd

The Senedd (formerly the National Assembly for Wales) is the devolved legislature of Wales with power to make legislation and vary taxes. The Parliament comprises 60 members, who are known as Members of the Senedd, or MSs. Members are elected for four-year terms under an additional members system, where 40 MSs represent geographical constituencies elected by the plurality system, and 20 MSs from five electoral regions using the d'Hondt method of proportional representation.

The Welsh Parliament was created by the Government of Wales Act 1998, which followed a referendum in 1997. On its creation, most of the powers of the Welsh Office and Secretary of State for Wales were transferred to it. The Senedd had no powers to initiate primary legislation until limited law-making powers were gained through the Government of Wales Act 2006. Its primary law-making powers were enhanced following a Yes vote in the referendum on 3 March 2011, making it possible for it to legislate without having to consult the British parliament, nor the Secretary of State for Wales in the 20 areas that are devolved.

Northern Ireland Assembly

The government of Northern Ireland was established as a result of the 1998 Good Friday Agreement. This created the Northern Ireland Assembly. The Assembly is a unicameral body consisting of 90 members elected under the Single Transferable Vote form of proportional representation. The Assembly is based on the principle of power-sharing, in order to ensure that both communities in Northern Ireland, unionist and nationalist, participate in governing the region. It has power to legislate in a wide range of areas and to elect the Northern Ireland Executive (cabinet). It sits at Parliament Buildings at Stormont in Belfast.

The Assembly has authority to legislate in a field of competences known as "transferred matters". These matters are not explicitly enumerated in the Northern Ireland Act 1998 but instead include any competence not explicitly retained by the Parliament at Westminster. Powers reserved by Westminster are divided into "excepted matters", which it retains indefinitely, and "reserved matters", which may be transferred to the competence of the Northern Ireland Assembly at a future date. Health, criminal law and education are "transferred" while royal relations are all "excepted".

While the Assembly was in suspension, due to issues involving the main parties and the Provisional Irish Republican Army (IRA), its legislative powers were exercised by the UK government, which effectively had power to legislate by decree. Laws that would normally be within the competence of the Assembly were passed by the UK government in the form of Orders-in-Council rather than legislative acts.

There has been a significant decrease in violence over the last twenty years, though the situation remains tense, with the more hard-line parties such as Sinn Féin and the Democratic Unionist Party now holding the most parliamentary seats (see Demographics and politics of Northern Ireland).

Judiciary

The United Kingdom does not have a single legal system due to it being created by the political union of previously independent countries with the terms of the Treaty of Union guaranteeing the continued existence of Scotland's separate legal system.  Today the UK has three distinct systems of law: English law, Northern Ireland law and Scots law. Recent constitutional changes saw a new Supreme Court of the United Kingdom come into being in October 2009 that took on the appeal functions of the Appellate Committee of the House of Lords. The Judicial Committee of the Privy Council, comprising the same members as the Supreme Court, is the highest court of appeal for several independent Commonwealth countries, the UK overseas territories, and the British crown dependencies.

England, Wales and Northern Ireland

Both English law, which applies in England and Wales, and Northern Ireland law are based on common-law principles. The essence of common-law is that law is made by judges sitting in courts, applying their common sense and knowledge of legal precedent (stare decisis) to the facts before them. The Courts of England and Wales are headed by the Senior Courts of England and Wales, consisting of the Court of Appeal, the High Court of Justice (for civil cases) and the Crown Court (for criminal cases). The Supreme Court of the United Kingdom is the highest court in the land for both criminal and civil cases in England, Wales, and Northern Ireland and any decision it makes is binding on every other court in the hierarchy.

Scotland

Scots law, a hybrid system based on both common-law and civil-law principles, applies in Scotland. The chief courts are the Court of Session, for civil cases, and the High Court of Justiciary, for criminal cases. The Supreme Court of the United Kingdom serves as the highest court of appeal for civil cases under Scots law. Sheriff courts deal with most civil and criminal cases including conducting criminal trials with a jury, known that as Sheriff solemn Court, or with a Sheriff and no jury, known as (Sheriff summary Court). The Sheriff courts provide a local court service with 49 Sheriff courts organised across six Sheriffdoms.

Electoral systems

Various electoral systems are used in the UK:

 The first-past-the-post system is used for general elections to the House of Commons, and also for some local government elections in England and Wales. the first-past-the-post system elects members to parliament through individual elections in each of the 650 constituencies in the UK. To be elected to the House of Commons candidates require the biggest share of votes. Each constituency can only elect one member to parliament, voters are given a ballot paper with a list of candidates of which they can select one. [1]
 The plurality-at-large voting (the bloc vote) is also used for some local government elections in England and Wales. the plurality system is a simple way of election, the winner requires only to gain more votes than any other candidate.[2]
 The additional member system is used for elections to the Scottish Parliament, Senedd and London Assembly. The system is implemented differently in each of the three locations. the additional member's system used when electing members of parliament is a combination of the first-past-the-post system and the party-list system. voters are given two ballots, on one is the candidates running to be elected as an MP, the other ballot has a list of parties that are running for a seat in parliament, voters choose their preferred party. [3]
 The single transferable vote system is used in Northern Ireland to elect the Northern Ireland Assembly, local councils, and Members of the European Parliament, and in Scotland to elect local councils. the single transferrable vote is a form of proportional representation, the strength of a party in parliament is equal to the number of votes they received during a general election. Areas elect a team of representatives rather than the traditional one, they also represent a larger area. voters rank their choices, they can rank as many as they choose since parties will run more than one candidate in each area. To be elected candidates have to receive a specific number of votes, the quota, which is decided based on the number of vacancies and the number of people that can vote.[4]
 The alternative vote system is used for by-elections in Scottish local councils. the alternative vote system is designed to deal with vote splitting. under the first-past-the-post system, a candidate can win even when the majority voted against them if this majority is split over several other candidates. voters rank the candidates from their preferred to their least preferred, if a candidate is the first choice for more than half of the votes cast they win. but when there is no majority the loser is removed and the second choice becomes the first, this process is repeated until one candidate receives the majority. [5]
 The D'Hondt method of party-list proportional representation was used for European Parliament elections in England, Scotland and Wales between 1999 and 2019 (the last such election before 'Brexit').
 The supplementary vote is used to elect directly elected mayors in England, including the mayor of London.

The use of the first-past-the-post to elect members of Parliament is unusual among European nations. The use of the system means that when three or more candidates receive a significant share of the vote, MPs are often elected from individual constituencies with a plurality (receiving more votes than any other candidate), but not an absolute majority (50 per cent plus one vote).

Elections and political parties in the United Kingdom are affected by Duverger's law, the political science principle which states that plurality voting systems, such as first-past-the-post, tend to lead to the development of two-party systems. The UK, like several other states, has sometimes been called a "two-and-a-half" party system, because parliamentary politics is dominated by the Labour Party and Conservative Party, while the Liberal Democrats, used to, hold a significant number of seats (but still substantially less than Labour and the Conservatives), and several small parties (some of them regional or nationalist) trailing far behind in the number of seats, although this changed in the 2015 general election.

In the last few general elections, voter mandates for Westminster in the 30–40% ranges have been swung into 60% parliamentary majorities. No single party has won a majority of the popular vote since the Third National Government of Stanley Baldwin in 1935. On two occasions since World War II – 1951 and February 1974 – a party that came in second in the popular vote came out with the larger number of seats.

Electoral reform for parliamentary elections have been proposed many times. The Jenkins Commission report in October 1998 suggested implementing the Alternative Vote Top-up (also called alternative vote plus or AV+) in parliamentary elections. Under this proposal, most MPs would be directly elected from constituencies by the alternative vote, with a number of additional members elected from "top-up lists." However, no action was taken by the Labour government at the time. There are several groups in the UK campaigning for electoral reform, including the Electoral Reform Society, Make Votes Count Coalition and Fairshare. The boundary commission for England has also suggested in its 2023 boundary review that constituency lines should be redrawn to allow constituencies to have a similar number of residents.

The 2010 general election resulted in a hung parliament (no single party being able to command a majority in the House of Commons). This was only the second general election since World War II to return a hung parliament, the first being the February 1974 election. The Conservatives gained the most seats (ending 13 years of Labour government) and the largest percentage of the popular vote but fell 20 seats short of a majority.

The Conservatives and Liberal Democrats entered into a new coalition government, headed by David Cameron. Under the terms of the coalition agreement, the government committed itself to hold a referendum in May 2011 on whether to change parliamentary elections from first-past-the-post to AV. Electoral reform was a major priority for the Liberal Democrats, who favour proportional representation but were able to negotiate only a referendum on AV (the alternative vote system is not a form of proportional representation) with the Conservatives. The coalition partners campaigned on opposite sides, with the Liberal Democrats supporting AV and the Conservatives opposing it. The referendum resulted in the Conservative's favour and the first-past-the-post system was maintained.

Political parties

Since the 1920s the two main political parties in the UK, in terms of the number of seats in the House of Commons, are the Conservative and Unionist Party and the Labour Party. The Scottish National Party has the second largest party membership, but a smaller number of MPs as it only fields candidates for constituencies in Scotland.

The modern day Conservative Party was founded in 1834 and is an outgrowth of the Tory movement or party, which began in 1678. Today it is still colloquially referred to as the Tory Party and members/supporters are referred to as Tories. The Liberal Democrats (or "Lib Dems") were founded in 1988 by an amalgamation of the Liberal Party and the Social Democratic Party (SDP), a right-wing Labour breakaway movement formed in 1981. The Liberals and SDP had contested elections together as the SDP–Liberal Alliance for seven years previously. The modern Liberal Party had been founded in 1859 as an outgrowth of the Whig movement or party (which began at the same time as the Tory Party and was its historical rival) as well as the Radical and Peelite tendencies.

The Liberal Party was one of the two dominant parties (along with the Conservatives) from its founding until the 1920s, when it rapidly declined in popularity, and was supplanted on the left by the Labour Party, which was founded in 1900 and formed its first minority government in 1924. Since that time, the Labour and Conservative parties have been dominant, with the Liberals (later Liberal Democrats) being the third-largest party until 2015, when they lost 49 of their 57 seats, they now hold 11 seats. They lost 10 seats in the 2019 general election. Currently the Scottish National Party is the third largest party and have been since the 2015 General Election when they gained 56 seats. Founded in 1934, the SNP advocates Scottish independence and has had continuous representation in Parliament since 1967. The SNP currently leads a minority government in the Scottish Parliament, and has 48 MPs in the House of Commons after the 2019 general election.

Minor parties also hold seats in parliament:
Plaid Cymru, the Welsh nationalist party, has had continuous representation in Parliament since 1974, and currently hold three of the 40 Welsh seats (with a fourth member which the whip revoked). Plaid has had the second highest number of seats in the Senedd, after Welsh Labour for most of the period since devolution in 1999, but currently has the same number (10) as the Welsh Conservatives. They currently have three MPs.
In Northern Ireland, all 18 MPs are from parties that only contest elections in Northern Ireland (except for Sinn Féin, which contests elections in both Northern Ireland and the Republic of Ireland). The unionist Democratic Unionist Party (DUP) (who currently hold eight seats), the republican Sinn Féin (who currently hold seven seats), the nationalist Social Democratic and Labour Party (SDLP) (who currently hold two), and the non-sectarian Alliance Party of Northern Ireland (who currently hold one seat) all gained seats in Parliament at the 2010 general election, the Alliance Party for the first time. Sinn Féin has a policy of abstentionism and their MPs refuse to take their seats in Parliament, and have done so since 1918. The DUP, Sinn Féin, the Ulster Unionist Party (UUP), and the SDLP are considered the four major political parties in Northern Ireland, holding the most seats in the Northern Ireland Assembly.
The Alba Party, led by former SNP leader Alex Salmond, has two seats. Both of their MPs, Kenny MacAskill and Neale Hanvey, were elected for the SNP at the 2019 election, but defected to Alba in March 2021.
The Green Party of England and Wales holds one seat, which it has held since 2010.
There are also Independent MPs. One is the Speaker, Lindsay Hoyle who revoked his Labour affiliation after the 2019 Speaker election. Others have had their whip revoked or have resigned from their political party.

At the most recent general election in 2019, the Conservatives, gained a majority after two years of being a minority government.

Conservatives (Tories)

The Conservative Party won the largest number of seats at the 2015 general election, returning 330 MPs, enough for an overall majority, and went on to form the first Conservative majority government since the 1992 general election. The Conservatives won only 318 seats at the 2017 general election, but went on to form a confidence and supply deal with the Democratic Unionist Party (DUP) who got 10 seats in the House of Commons, allowing the Conservative Party to remain in government. The Conservatives won 365 seats at the 2019 general election and had a majority, forming the first majority government since 2015–17.

The Conservative Party can trace its origin back to 1662, with the Court Party and the Country Party being formed in the aftermath of the English Civil War. The Court Party soon became known as the Tories, a name that has stuck despite the official name being 'Conservative'. The term "Tory" originates from the Exclusion Crisis of 1678-1681 - the Whigs were those who supported the exclusion of the Roman Catholic Duke of York from the thrones of England, Ireland and Scotland, and the Tories were those who opposed it. Both names were originally insults: a "whiggamore" was a horse drover (See Whiggamore Raid), and a "tory" (Tóraidhe) was an Irish term for an outlaw, later applied to Irish Confederates and Irish Royalists, during the Wars of the Three Kingdoms. Generally, the Tories were associated with lesser gentry and the Church of England, while Whigs were more associated with trade, money, larger land holders (or "land magnates"), expansion and tolerance of Catholicism. The Rochdale Radicals were a group of more extreme reformists who were also heavily involved in the cooperative movement. They sought to bring about a more equal society, and are considered by modern standards to be left-wing.

After becoming associated with repression of popular discontent in the years after 1815, the Tories underwent a fundamental transformation under the influence of Robert Peel, himself an industrialist rather than a landowner, who in his 1834 "Tamworth Manifesto" outlined a new "Conservative" philosophy of reforming ills while conserving the good.
Though Peel's supporters subsequently split from their colleagues over the issue of free trade in 1846, ultimately joining the Whigs and the Radicals to form what would become the Liberal Party, Peel's version of the party's underlying outlook was retained by the remaining Tories, who adopted his label of Conservative as the official name of their party.

The Conservatives were in government for eighteen years between 1979 and 1997, under the leadership of the first-ever female Prime Minister, Margaret Thatcher, and former Chancellor of the Exchequer John Major (1990–97). Their landslide defeat at the 1997 general election saw the Conservative Party lose over half their seats gained in 1992, and saw the party re-align with public perceptions of them. The Conservatives lost all their seats in both Scotland and Wales, and was their worst defeat since 1906.
In 2008, the Conservative Party formed a pact with the Ulster Unionist Party (UUP) to select joint candidates for European and House of Commons elections; this angered the DUP as by splitting the Unionist vote, republican parties will be elected in some areas.

After thirteen years in opposition, the Conservatives returned to power as part of a coalition agreement with the Liberal Democrats in 2010, going on to form a majority government in 2015. David Cameron resigned as Prime Minister in July 2016, which resulted in the appointment of the country's second female Prime Minister, Theresa May. The Conservative Party is the only party in the history of the United Kingdom to have been governed by a female Prime Minister. In 2019, Boris Johnson was appointed Prime Minister after Theresa May stepped down during Brexit negotiations. At one point during 2019 his party had a parliamentary minority for a short period after he ejected a large number of party members, of which some were subsequently allowed to return for the 2019 General election. After the election the Tories returned with a majority government under Johnson.

Historically, the party has been the mainland party most pre-occupied by British unionism, as attested to by the party's full name, the Conservative and Unionist Party. This resulted in the merger between the Conservatives and Joseph Chamberlain's Liberal Unionist Party, composed of former Liberals who opposed Irish home rule. The unionist tendency is still in evidence today, manifesting sometimes as a scepticism or opposition to devolution, firm support for the continued existence of the United Kingdom in the face of movements advocating independence from the UK, and a historic link with the cultural unionism of Northern Ireland.

Labour

The Labour Party won the second-largest number of seats in the House of Commons at the 2019 general election, with 202 seats overall, 60 seats less than 2017.

The history of the Labour Party goes back to 1900, when a Labour Representation Committee was established and changed its name to "The Labour Party" in 1906. After the First World War, this led to the demise of the Liberal Party as the main reformist force in British politics. The existence of the Labour Party on the left-wing of British politics led to a slow waning of energy from the Liberal Party, which has consequently assumed third place in national politics. After performing poorly at the general elections of 1922, 1923 and 1924, the Liberal Party was superseded by the Labour Party as being the party of the left.

Following two brief spells in minority governments in 1924 and 1929–1931, the Labour Party won a landslide victory after World War II at the 1945 "khaki election"; winning a majority for the first time ever. Throughout the rest of the twentieth century, Labour governments alternated with Conservative governments. The Labour Party suffered the "wilderness years" of 1951–1964 (three consecutive general election defeats) and 1979–1997 (four consecutive general election defeats). During this second period, Margaret Thatcher, who became Leader of the Conservative Party in 1975, made a fundamental change to Conservative policies, turning the Conservative Party into an economically liberal party. At the 1979 general election, she defeated James Callaghan's Labour government following the Winter of Discontent. For all of the 1980s and most of the 1990s, Conservative governments under Thatcher and her successor John Major pursued policies of privatisation, anti-trade-unionism, and, for a time, monetarism, now known collectively as Thatcherism.

The Labour Party elected left-winger Michael Foot as their leader in 1980, and he responded to dissatisfaction within the Labour Party by pursuing a number of radical policies developed by its grassroots members. In 1981, several centrist and right-leaning Labour MPs formed a breakaway group called the Social Democratic Party (SDP), a move which split Labour and is widely believed to have made the Labour Party unelectable for a decade. The SDP formed an alliance with the Liberal Party which contested the 1983 and 1987 general elections as a pro-European, centrist alternative to Labour and the Conservatives. Following some initial success, the SDP did not prosper (partly due to its unfavourable distribution of votes by the First-Past-the-Post electoral system), and was accused by some of splitting the Labour vote.
The SDP eventually merged with the Liberal Party to form the Liberal Democrats in 1988. 

The Labour Party was defeated in a landslide at the 1983 general election, and Michael Foot was replaced shortly thereafter by Neil Kinnock as party leader. Kinnock progressively expelled members of Militant, a left-wing group which practised entryism, and moderated many of the party's policies. Despite these changes, as well as electoral gains and also due to Kinnock's negative media image, Labour was defeated at the 1987 and 1992 
general elections, and he was succeeded by Shadow Chancellor of the Exchequer, John Smith. Shadow Home Secretary Tony Blair became Leader of the Labour Party following Smith's sudden death from a heart attack in 1994. He continued to move the Labour Party towards the "centre" by loosening links with the unions and continuing many of Thatcher's neoliberal policies. This, coupled with the professionalising of the party machine's approach to the media, helped Labour win a historic landslide at the 1997 general election, after eighteen consecutive years of Conservative rule. Some observers say the Labour Party had by then morphed from a democratic socialist party to a social democratic party, a process which delivered three general election victories but alienated some of its core base; leading to the formation of the Socialist Labour Party. A subset of Labour MPs stand as joint Labour and Co-operative candidates due to a long-standing electoral alliance between the Labour Party and the Co-operative Party - the political arm of the British co-operative movement. At the 2019 general election, 26 were elected.

Scottish National Party

The Scottish National Party won the third-largest number of seats in the House of Commons at the 2015 general election, winning 56 MPs from the 59 constituencies in Scotland having won 50% of the popular vote. This was an increase of 50 MPs on the result achieved in 2010.

At the 2017 general election, the SNP won 35 seats, a net loss of 21 seats.

At the 2019 general election, the SNP won 48 seats, a net gain of 13 seats.

The SNP has enjoyed parliamentary representation continuously since 1967. Following the 2007 Scottish parliamentary elections, the SNP emerged as the largest party with 47 MSPs and formed a minority government with Alex Salmond as First Minister. After the 2011 Scottish parliamentary election, the SNP won enough seats to form a majority government, the first time this had ever happened since devolution was established in 1999.

Members of the Scottish National Party and Plaid Cymru work together as a single parliamentary group following a formal pact signed in 1986. This group currently has 49 MPs.

Liberal Democrats

The Liberal Democrats won the fourth largest number of seats at the 2019 general election, returning 11 MPs. 
 
The Liberal Democrats were founded in 1988 by an amalgamation of the Liberal Party with the Social Democratic Party, but can trace their origin back to the Whigs and the Rochdale Radicals who evolved into the Liberal Party. The term 'Liberal Party' was first used officially in 1868, though it had been in use colloquially for decades beforehand. The Liberal Party formed a government in 1868 and then alternated with the Conservative Party as the party of government throughout the late-nineteenth century and early-twentieth century.

The Liberal Democrats are a party with policies on constitutional and political reforms, including changing the voting system for general elections (2011 United Kingdom Alternative Vote referendum), abolishing the House of Lords and replacing it with a 300-member elected Senate, introducing fixed five-year Parliaments, and introducing a National Register of Lobbyists. They also support what they see as greater fairness and social mobility. In the coalition government, the party promoted legislation introducing a pupil premium - funding for schools directed at the poorest students to give them an equal chance in life. They also supported same-sex marriage and increasing the income tax threshold to £10,000, a pre-election manifesto commitment.

Northern Ireland parties

The Democratic Unionist Party (DUP) had 8 MPs elected at the 2019 general election. Founded in 1971 by Ian Paisley, it has grown to become the larger of the two main unionist political parties in Northern Ireland. Sinn Féin MPs had 7 MPs elected at the 2019 election, but Sinn Féin MPs traditionally abstain from the House of Commons and refuse to take their seats in what they view as a "foreign" parliament.

Plaid Cymru

Plaid Cymru has enjoyed parliamentary representation continuously since 1974 and had 4 MPs elected at the 2019 general election, though one was suspended. Following the 2007 Welsh Assembly elections, they joined Labour as the junior partner in a coalition government, but have fallen down to the third-largest party in the Assembly after the 2011 Assembly elections, and have become an opposition party.

Other parliamentary parties

The Green Party of England and Wales has had a single MP, Caroline Lucas, since 2010 and re-elected at the 2019 general election (the party previously had an MP in 1992; Cynog Dafis, Ceredigion, who was elected on a joint Plaid Cymru/Green Party ticket). It also has three seats on the London Assembly and over 500 local councillors as of May 2022.

The UK Independence Party (UKIP) had one MP and 24 seats in the European Parliament as well as a number of local councillors. UKIP also had a MLA in the Northern Ireland Assembly. UKIP had become an emerging alternative party among some voters, gaining the third-largest share of the vote in the 2015 general election and the largest share of the vote of any party (27%) in the 2014 European elections. In 2014 UKIP gained its first ever MP following the defection and re-election of Douglas Carswell in the 2014 Clacton by-election. They campaign mainly on issues such as reducing immigration and EU withdrawal. They no longer have any MPs.

The Respect party, a left-wing group that came out of the anti-war movement had a single MP, George Galloway from 2005 to 2010, and again between 2012 and 2015.

Change UK was a political party formed and disbanded in 2019. It had five MPs, four of whom were elected as Labour MPs, and one as Conservative MPs.

There are usually a small number of Independent politicians in parliament with no party allegiance. In modern times, this has usually occurred when a sitting member leaves their party, and some such MPs have been re-elected as independents. Since 1950, only two new members have been elected as independents without having ever stood for a major party:
Martin Bell represented the Tatton constituency in Cheshire between 1997 and 2001. He was elected following a "sleaze" scandal involving the-then incumbent Conservative MP, Neil Hamilton. Bell, a BBC journalist, stood as an anti-corruption independent candidate, and the Labour and Liberal Democrat parties withdrew their candidates from the election.
Dr. Richard Taylor MP was elected for the Wyre Forest constituency in 2001 on a platform opposing the closure of Kidderminster hospital. He later established Health Concern, the party under which he ran in 2005.

Non-Parliamentary political parties

Other political parties exist, but struggle to return MPs to Parliament.

The Brexit Party was founded in January 2019, with leader Nigel Farage (former retired UKIP leader). It initially had 14 MEPs, all of whom had been elected as members of UKIP. In the 2019 European Parliament election in the United Kingdom, it returned 29 MEPs. The MEPs were elected representatives of the party until 11pm on 31 January 2020 when the UK left the European Union and the position of British MEPs was subsequently abolished.

Following the 2021 Scottish Parliament Election the Scottish Greens have 8 MSPs in the Scottish Parliament and are the junior partner in the SNP/Green coalition. They also 35 local councillors.

The Green Party in Northern Ireland has previously had MLAs in the Northern Ireland Assembly. They currently have 8 local councillors.

The Scottish Socialist Party (SSP) won its first seat in the Scottish Parliament in the 1999 Scottish Parliament election. In the 2003 Scottish Parliament election the party increased their number of seats to 6. The party built up its support through opposing the war in Iraq and fighting for policies such as free school meals and an end to prescription charges. In the 2007 Scottish Parliament election it lost all of its MSPs but remains politically active and continues to contest elections.

The British National Party (BNP) became the official opposition in the 2006 Barking and Dagenham Council election, won a seat in the 2008 London Assembly election, two seats in the 2009 European elections, and received the fifth-highest share of votes in the 2010 general election. At their peak they had 58 local councillors. However, the early 2010s saw the BNP's support collapse and became fractured, resulting in them  losing all elected representation by 2018.

The British Democratic Party (BDP) was founded in 2013 by Andrew Brons, one of the British National Party's two MEPs. In 2022, following the collapse of the BNP, a plethora of prominent ex-BNP members rapidly began coalescing around the British Democrats. It is currently the only far-right UK political party with any elected representation.

The Women's Equality Party (WEP) was founded in 2015. The party gained its first elected representation in the 2019 United Kingdom local elections, winning one local councillor seat on Congleton Town Council. The party has no other elected representation at any other level of governance.

The Libertarian Party was founded in 2008 and has contested several local elections and parliamentary constituencies. It has no elected representatives at any level of governance.

The English Democrats was founded in 2002 and advocates England having its own parliament. The party's candidate was elected mayor of Doncaster in 2009, before resigning from the party in February 2013.

Other parties include: the Socialist Labour Party (UK), the Socialist Party of Great Britain, the Communist Party of Britain, the Socialist Party (England and Wales), the Socialist Workers Party, the Liberal Party, Mebyon Kernow (a Cornish nationalist party) in Cornwall, the Yorkshire Party in Yorkshire, and the National Health Action Party. The Pirate Party UK existed from 2009 to 2020.

Several local parties contest only within a specific area, a single county, borough or district. Examples include the Better Bedford Independent Party, which was one of the dominant parties in Bedford Borough Council and led by Bedford's former Mayor, Frank Branston. The most notable local party is Health Concern, which controlled a single seat in the British Parliament from 2001 to 2010.

The Jury Team, launched in March 2009 and described as a "non-party party", is an umbrella organisation seeking to increase the number of independent MPs.

The Official Monster Raving Loony Party was founded in 1983. The OMRLP are distinguished by having a deliberately bizarre manifesto, which contains things that seem to be impossible or too absurd to implement – usually to highlight what they see as real-life absurdities. It is effectively regarded as a satirical political party.

2015 to 2019
After winning the largest number of seats and votes in the 2015 general election, the Conservatives under David Cameron, remained ahead of the Labour Party, led by Jeremy Corbyn since September 2015. The SNP maintained its position in Scotland, the party was just short of an overall majority at the Scottish parliamentary elections in May 2016.

However, a turbulent referendum on the United Kingdom's membership of the European Union, called for by David Cameron, led to his resignation, the appointment of a new prime minister Theresa May, and divided opinion on Europe amongst the party.

In addition, the EU referendum campaign plunged the Labour Party into crisis and resulted in a motion of no confidence in the party leader Jeremy Corbyn being passed by the party's MPs in a 172–40 vote, which followed a significant number of resignations from the Shadow Cabinet. This led to a leadership election which began with Angela Eagle, the former Shadow First Secretary of State and Shadow Secretary of State for Business, Innovation and Skills who eight days later withdrew from the leadership race, to support Owen Smith, the former Shadow Secretary of State for Work and Pensions. This was won by Jeremy Corbyn with an increased majority.

Following the vote to leave the European Union, Nigel Farage offered his own resignation as leader, something he had campaigned for since 1992.  A leadership contest also took place in the Green Party, which led to the joint election on 2 September 2016 of Jonathan Bartley and Caroline Lucas as co-leaders, who took over the role in a job-share arrangement. Lucas, was previously leader until 2010 and is the party's only MP. Strategic cross-party alliances have been initiated, including a "progressive alliance" and a "Patriotic Alliance", as proposed by UKIP donor Arron Banks.

In 2017, the prime minister, Theresa May, called a general election. She hoped to increase the conservative majority to diffuse party opposition to her deal to leave the EU. In the election, the conservatives lost seats and the Labour party, under Jeremy Corbyn, gained 30 seats. This led to a minority conservative government supported by the DUP.

The Economist Intelligence Unit (EIU) rated the United Kingdom as a "full democracy" in 2017. In the 2018 EIU democracy index, the UK remained 11th out of the 14 western European nations classed as 'full democracy' with an overall score of 8.53 out of a maximum of 10. It received a comparatively low mark in the 'functioning of government' assessment.

In July 2019, Boris Johnson won the leadership of the conservative party following the resignation of May. He became the prime minister by default.

In August 2019, Prime Minister Boris Johnson requested the monarch, Queen Elizabeth II, to prorogue the British parliament. Although this measure is common for incoming governments to allow time to prepare the Queen's speech, the move caused great controversy as it was announced to last 23 days instead of the usual 4 or 5 days. It would end the current session of the Parliament that had been running for 2 years and prevent further parliamentary debate. The government stated that it was nothing to do with Brexit and that there would still be "ample time" for debate before Brexit happens. Opponents believed that parliament had been suspended to force through a no-deal Brexit and prevent parliament from being able to thwart the government's plan. Others argued that it facilitated the Brexit negotiations by forcing the EU to modify the current proposed deal. The move is unprecedented in British politics and caused debate in the media, an attempt to stop it in the Scottish Court of Session, an attempt by ex-prime minister John Major and others to stop it in the English High Court and in the High Court in Northern Ireland. It was reported by many media sources that the move takes the UK one more step towards a full dictatorship from its current status of 'elective dictatorship'. The legality of the suspension of parliament was tested in courts in England and Scotland. The case was appealed to the Supreme Court of the United Kingdom. On 24 September, it ruled unanimously that the prorogation was both justiciable and unlawful. The prorogation was quashed and deemed "null and of no [legal] effect". Parliament resumed the next day.

On the return of parliament the government lost its majority when Conservative MP Phillip Lee crossed the floor of the house to join the Liberal Democrats. This meant that the combined votes of the Conservative and DUP MPs amounted to one less than the combined votes of opposition parties. The government of Boris Johnson then lost a vote, 301 to 328, giving control of the agenda of the house to the MPs, removing the control the government had over the introduction of new laws. The 21 Conservative MPs who voted against their own government had the whip removed by Number 10, removing them from the party. This included long-standing members of the party. Johnson called for a general election and following a few attempts succeeded in getting a vote approving an election through parliament.

Current political landscape
note: this section is outdated.

In the December 2019 general election, the Conservative Party, led by Boris Johnson, won a large overall majority. Jeremy Corbyn resigned as leader of the Labour Party. Jo Swinson resigned as Lib Dem leader after losing her own seat.

On 20 December 2019, the Brexit withdrawal agreement was passed. The UK left the EU on 31 January 2020 at 11 p.m. GMT and entered a transition period, set to finish on 31 December 2020.

In January 2020, the Labour Party began the process of electing a new leader. On 4 April 2020, Keir Starmer was elected leader of the Labour Party with 56.2% of the vote in the first round.

In October 2020, Corbyn was suspended from the Labour Party over his comments about antisemitism. According to The Washington Post:
Corbyn's ouster from a party he led in the last two national elections, in 2019 and 2017, was a stunning rebuke and mark him now as a near-outcast, at least temporarily. The suspension also shines light on a long-running feud within Europe's largest democratic socialist party over its very soul, as hard-left “Corbynistas” pushing for radical change duke it out with a more moderate wing more ideologically aligned with Tony Blair, the centrist former Labour prime minister.
The present dispute within the Labour party is likely causing the leftist political coalition to further fragment since the catastrophic result in 2019. Polling generally indicates that at present (August 2021) Labour has lost significant portions of its vote share to the Green party and the Liberal Democrats. At Labour Conference 2021, several showdowns between the left and right of the party are expected to take place. This includes but is not limited to: a motion to give members power to approve or reject decisions over the Labour whip within the PLP, a potential rejection of the pro-Starmer interim General Secretary David Evans by unions and members alike, a debate over PR and a significant debate over the loss of members and their subscription fees since Corbyn's expulsion which has left the party in a dire state regarding its activist and financial bases.

The SNP and the Scottish Greens won the right to form a Scottish coalition government in May 2021. The precise arrangement is loose and allows the Greens freedom to criticise official SNP policy on key areas of disagreement. However, it provides FM Nicola Sturgeon with a mandate to call for a new independence referendum after the failed one in 2014. Proponents of a new referendum particularly cite Brexit as changing the political situation, thus leading Scots to be more pro-independence than in 2014. As an issue, Scottish independence is known to cross-cut across party lines, with many Scottish Labour voters in particular being favourable to the prospect of independence.

Membership

All political parties have membership schemes that allow members of the public to actively influence the policy and direction of the party to varying degrees, though particularly at a local level. Membership of British political parties is around 1% of the British electorate, which is lower than in all European countries except for Poland and Latvia. Overall membership to a political party has been in decline since the 1950s. In 1951, the Conservative Party had 2.2 million members, and a year later in 1952 the Labour Party reached their peak of 1 million members (of an electorate of around 34 million).

The table below details the membership numbers of political parties that have more than 5,000 members.

No data could be collected for the four parties of Northern Ireland: the DUP, UUP, SDLP, and Sinn Féin. However, in January 1997, it was estimated that the UUP had 10,000 – 12,000 members, and the DUP had 5,000 members.

In December 2020, the UK Independence Party had 3,888 members.

In June 2019, Reform UK claimed to have 115,000 registered supporters.

Local government

The UK is divided into a complex system of local governance.

Former European Union membership

The United Kingdom first joined the then European Communities in January 1973 by the then Conservative Prime Minister Edward Heath, and remained a member of the European Union (EU) that it evolved into; British citizens, and other EU citizens resident in the UK, between 1979 and 2019 elected members to represent them in the European Parliament in Brussels and Strasbourg.

The UK's membership in the Union has been a major topic of debate over the years and has been objected to over questions of sovereignty, and in recent years there have been divisions in both major parties over whether the UK should form greater ties within the EU, or reduce the EU's supranational powers. Opponents of greater European integration are known as "Eurosceptics", while supporters are known as "Europhiles". Division over Europe is prevalent in both major parties, although the Conservative Party is seen as most divided over the issue, both whilst in Government up to 1997 and after 2010, and between those dates as the opposition. However, the Labour Party is also divided, with conflicting views over British adoption of the euro whilst in Government (1997–2010).

British nationalists have long campaigned against European integration. The strong showing of the eurosceptic UK Independence Party (UKIP) since the 2004 European Parliament elections has shifted the debate over UK relations with the EU.

In March 2008, Parliament decided to not hold a referendum on the ratification of the Treaty of Lisbon, signed in December 2007. This was despite the Labour government promising in 2004 to hold a referendum on the previously proposed Constitution for Europe.

On 23 June 2016, the United Kingdom voted to leave the European Union in a referendum. After the referendum, it was debated as to how and when the UK should leave the EU. On 11 July 2016, the Cabinet Office Minister, John Penrose failed to deliver a final answer on whether it would be at the disposal of the Prime Minister and one of the Secretaries of State, through the royal prerogative, or of Parliament, through primary legislation.

In October 2016 the Conservative Prime Minister, Theresa May, announced that Article 50 would be invoked by "the first quarter of 2017". On 24 January 2017 the Supreme Court ruled in the Miller case by a majority that the process could not be initiated without an authorising act of parliament, but unanimously ruled against the Scottish government's claim in respect of devolution that they had a direct say in the decision to trigger Article 50. Consequently, the European Union (Notification of Withdrawal) Act 2017 empowering the prime minister to invoke Article 50 was passed and enacted by royal assent in March 2017.

Invocation of Article 50 by the United Kingdom government occurred on 29 March 2017, when Sir Tim Barrow, the Permanent Representative of the United Kingdom to the European Union, formally delivered by hand a letter signed by Prime Minister Theresa May to Donald Tusk, the President of the European Council in Brussels. The letter also contained the United Kingdom's intention to withdraw from the European Atomic Energy Community (EAEC or Euratom). This means that the UK will cease to be a member of the EU on 30 March 2019, unless an extension to negotiations is agreed upon by the UK and EU.
The leaving date was subsequently revised by agreement with the EU to be 31 October 2019. This led to a change of prime minister who promised to leave the EU on this date either with a revised deal or with no-deal.

The UK withdrew from the EU at 23.00 GMT on 31 January 2020, beginning a transition period that was set to end on 31 December 2020. During the 11-month transition period, the UK and EU negotiated their future relationship which resulted in the EU–UK Trade and Cooperation Agreement which was agreed on 24 December 2020 just days before the end of the transition period. The UK ended the transition period which ended the incorporation of European Union law into UK law, and ended its membership of the EU Customs Union, and the European Single Market at 23:00 GMT on 31 December 2020.

International organisation participation

African Development Bank
Asian Development Bank
Australia Group
Bank for International Settlements
Commonwealth of Nations
Caribbean Development Bank (non-regional)
Council of Europe
CERN
Euro-Atlantic Partnership Council
European Bank for Reconstruction and Development
European Investment Bank
European Space Agency
Food and Agriculture Organization
G5, G6, G7, G8
G10
Inmarsat
Inter-American Development Bank
International Atomic Energy Agency
International Bank for Reconstruction and Development
International Civil Aviation Organization
International Chamber of Commerce
International Confederation of Free Trade Unions
International Criminal Court
International Criminal Police Organization - Interpol
International Development Association
International Energy Agency
International Federation of Red Cross and Red Crescent Societies
International Finance Corporation
International Fund for Agricultural Development
International Hydrographic Organization
International Labour Organization
International Maritime Organization
International Monetary Fund
International Olympic Committee (IOC)
International Organization for Migration (IOM) (observer)
International Organization for Standardization (ISO)
International Red Cross and Red Crescent Movement
International Telecommunications Satellite Organization (Intelsat)
International Telecommunication Union (ITU)
International Whaling Commission
MONUC
Non-Aligned Movement (NAM) (guest)
North Atlantic Treaty Organization (NATO)
Nuclear Energy Agency (NEA)
Nuclear Suppliers Group (NSG)
Organisation for Economic Co-operation and Development
Organisation for the Prohibition of Chemical Weapons
Organization for Security and Co-operation in Europe (OSCE)
Organization of American States (OAS) (observer)
 The Pacific Community (SPC)
Permanent Court of Arbitration
UNESCO
United Nations
United Nations Conference on Trade and Development (UNCTAD)
United Nations Economic Commission for Africa (associate)
United Nations Economic Commission for Europe
United Nations Economic Commission for Latin America and the Caribbean
United Nations Economic and Social Commission for Asia and the Pacific
United Nations High Commissioner for Refugees (UNHCR)
United Nations Industrial Development Organization (UNIDO)
United Nations Interim Administration Mission in Kosovo (UNMIK)
United Nations Iraq-Kuwait Observation Mission (UNIKOM)
United Nations Mission in Bosnia and Herzegovina (UNMIBH)
United Nations Mission in Sierra Leone (UNAMSIL)
United Nations Observer Mission in Georgia (UNOMIG)
United Nations Peacekeeping Force in Cyprus (UNFICYP)
United Nations Relief and Works Agency for Palestine Refugees in the Near East (UNRWA)
United Nations Security Council (permanent member)
Universal Postal Union (UPU)
UNTAET
Western European Union
World Confederation of Labour
World Customs Organization
World Health Organization
World Intellectual Property Organization
World Meteorological Organization
World Trade Organization
Zangger Committee

See also

 Absentee voting in the United Kingdom
 British political scandals
 British Polling Council
 Common Policy Frameworks of the United Kingdom
 Electoral registration in the United Kingdom
 History of taxation in the United Kingdom
 List of British political defections
 Parliament in the Making
 Parliament Week
 Pressure groups in the United Kingdom
 Referendums in the United Kingdom
 Reform Acts
 Universal basic income in the United Kingdom

Overviews by period
 2010s in United Kingdom political history
 Premiership of Boris Johnson

References

Further reading
 Oxford Dictionary of National Biography (2004) online; short scholarly biographies of all the major people who died by 2009
 Addison, Paul and Harriet Jones, eds. A Companion to Contemporary Britain: 1939–2000 (2005)  excerpt and text search
 Brown, David, Robert Crowcroft, and Gordon Pentland, eds. The Oxford Handbook of Modern British Political History, 1800-2000 (2018) excerpt
 Budge, Ian, et al. eds. The New British Politics (4th ed. 2007) 712pp
 Butler, David. British General Elections Since 1945 (1995) 195pp; excerpt and text search
 Cannon, John, ed. The Oxford Companion to British History (2003), historical encyclopedia; 4000 entries in 1046pp excerpt and text search
 Childs, David. Britain since 1945: A Political History (2012) excerpt and text search
 Cook, Chris and John Stevenson, eds. Longman Companion to Britain Since 1945 (1995) 336pp
 Fairlie, Henry.  "Oratory in Political Life," History Today (Jan 1960) 10#1 pp 3–13. A survey of political oratory in Britain from 1730 to 1960. 
 Hennessy, Peter. The Prime Minister: The Office and Its Holders Since 1945 (2001)  except and text search; Attlee to Blair; 688pp 
 Jones, Harriet, and Mark Clapson, eds. The Routledge Companion to Britain in the Twentieth Century (2009)   excerpt and text search
 King, Anthony. The British Constitution (2011) 464pp
  Leventhal, F.M. Twentieth-Century Britain: An Encyclopedia (2nd ed. 2002) 640pp; short articles by scholars
 Marr, Andrew. A History of Modern Britain (2009); also published as The Making of Modern Britain (2010), popular history 1945–2005
 Pugh, Martin. Speak for Britain!: A New History of the Labour Party (2011)   excerpt and text search
 Ramsden, John, ed. The Oxford Companion to Twentieth-Century British Politics (2005)  excerpt and text search

External links
 Prospect Magazine - UK based political magazine focussing on British and international politics, cultural essays and arguments  	
 British Politics - the only academic journal devoted purely to the study of political issues in Britain 	
 Directgov, main entry point for citizens to the UK government 
 Directgov - Guide to Government 	
 Official UK parliament website
 Official UK parliamentary membership by party 	
 British Government and Politics on the Internet from the Keele University School of Politics
 British Politics and Policy at LSE The London School of Economics' UK politics and policy blog 	
 ePolitix - UK Politics news website  	
 British Government and Politics Compiled by a retired English Librarian
 Women's Parliamentary Radio Interviews and resources about women politicians in the UK
 	

 

sv:Storbritannien#Statsskick och politik